Suraj Sanim is an Indian screen writer. He has written screenplays, dialogues and stories of many Hindi and Punjabi films like Shaheed-E-Mohabbat Boota Singh (1999), Sukhmani: Hope for Life (2010).

Filmography
Heera Panna (1973)
Bullet (1976)
Des Pardes (1978)
Lahu Ke Do Rang (1979)
Janam (1985)
Thikana (1987)
Kaash (1987)
Daddy (1989)
Awaargi (1990)
C.I.D. (1990)
Dil Aashna Hai (1992)
Shaheed-E-Mohabbat Boota Singh (1999)
Zindagi Khoobsurat Hai (2002)
Des Hoyaa Pardes (2004)
Waris Shah: Ishq Daa Waaris (2006)
Sukhmani: Hope for Life (2010)

References

External links

Indian male screenwriters
Living people
Year of birth missing (living people)
Punjabi screenwriters